Christian Ludwig Schuncke (21 December 18107 December 1834) was a German pianist and composer, and close friend of Robert Schumann.  His early promise was eclipsed by his death from tuberculosis at the age of 23.

He was generally known as Ludwig, and that name also appears as Louis in some references.  His surname appears as either Schuncke or Schunke.

Biography
Ludwig Schuncke was born in Kassel in 1810.  His father and first teacher Johann Gottfried Schuncke (1777–1840), and his uncle Johann Michael Schuncke (1778–1821), were both professional horn players.

He demonstrated his talents very early, and they were encouraged.  In March 1822, aged only 11, he performed Johann Nepomuk Hummel's Piano Concerto in A minor, Op. 85, under the direction of Louis Spohr. He then went on a concert tour of Germany. Carl Maria von Weber expressed his approval of Schuncke’s early compositions.

In 1828, he was one of the four pianists who played Henri Bertini's transcription of Beethoven's Seventh Symphony for eight hands, the others being Bertini himself, Franz Liszt and Sowinsky.

He went to Paris for study, where his main teachers were Friedrich Kalkbrenner, Anton Reicha and Henri Herz, and where he also had friendships with people such as Hector Berlioz, Sigismond Thalberg and Johann Peter Pixis. In Paris, he made his living by demonstrating Duport pianos, and he also lived in Duport's household.  After completing his studies, he returned to Germany.  In Stuttgart, he made the acquaintance of Frédéric Chopin after hearing him perform his Piano Concerto No. 1 in E minor. Schuncke dedicated his Caprice in C minor, Op.10, to Chopin. He then moved to Vienna, Prague and Dresden, appearing in concert, before finally settling in Leipzig in December 1833. He lived in a boarding house and his room was next door to that of Robert Schumann, whose very close friend he became. Schuncke was one of the co-founders of the Neue Zeitschrift für Musik, and one of its early contributors, under the pseudonym "Jonathan". He was also a member of Schumann's Davidsbund.

 He appeared as soloist at the Leipzig Gewandhaus on 27 January 1834.  In one article, Schumann favourably compared the playing of the emerging Franz Liszt to that of Ludwig Schuncke.

Schuncke dedicated his Grande Sonate in G minor, Op. 3, to Schumann, who greatly admired the work, and in turn dedicated his Toccata in C major, Op. 7, to Schuncke on its publication in 1834.   In a letter dated 4 September 1834, Schumann wrote that his whole wealth could be summed up in three names: Henriette Voigt, Ernestine von Fricken and Ludwig Schuncke.

Schumann's Carnaval, Op. 9, had its origin in a set of variations on a Sehnsuchtswalzer by Franz Schubert.  The catalyst for the variations may have been a work for piano and orchestra on the same theme by Schuncke (his Op. 14).  Schumann felt that Schuncke's heroic treatment was an inappropriate reflection of the tender nature of the Schubert piece, so he set out to approach his variations in a more intimate way, for piano solo.  He worked on the piece in 1833 and 1834.  The work was never completed, however, but he did re-use the opening 24 measures for the opening of Carnaval.

Schuncke helped Schumann through his crisis of 1833–34, in which he had a serious depressive illness leading to a suicide attempt, and his brother and sister-in-law both died.  Schumann in turn nursed Schuncke through his own final illness.  Ludwig Schuncke died on 7 December 1834, two weeks before his 24th birthday, of tuberculosis.  He is buried in the Alter Johannisfriedhof in Leipzig.  Schumann forever after kept Schuncke's death bed portrait in his own study, in a gallery of pictures hung above his piano.

Schuncke's music
Although their approaches sometimes differed, Schuncke and Schumann influenced each other to a significant degree.  This can be seen in the following example, where an excerpt from Schuncke's Grande Sonate in G minor could easily be played alongside an excerpt from Schumann's Piano Concerto in A minor.

Recorded legacy
Jozef De Beenhouwer was the first to perform Schuncke's Grande Sonate in G minor, Op. 3, which has also been recorded by Mario Patuzzi, Gregor Weichert and Sylviane Deferne.  (His name is shown on Patuzzi's, Weichert's and Deferne's albums as "Christian L. Schunke", "Louis Schuncke" and "Ludwig Schunke" respectively.)

His song Gretchen am Spinnrad is also recorded.

Works

Piano solo
 Scherzo Capriccioso, Op. 1 
 Variations sur une thème quasi Fantaisie brilliant original, in E-flat major, Op. 2 
 Grande Sonata in G minor, Op. 3 (1832, dedicated to Robert Schumann) 
 Fantasie brillante in E major, Op. 5 
 Allegro Passionato in A minor, Op. 6 
 Divertissement brilliant, Op. 7 
 1st Caprice in C major, Op. 9 (dedicated to Clara Wieck) 
 2nd Caprice in C minor, Op. 10 (dedicated to Frédéric Chopin) 
 Rondeau brilliant in E-flat major, Op.11 
 Divertissement brilliant sur des aires allemenades, in B-flat major, Op. 12 
 2 Pièces caractéristiques in B-flat minor and C minor, Op. 13 
 Rondeau in D major, Op.15 
 Air suisse varié 
 Six Preludes 
 Rondino précédé d'une Introduction 
 Adagio and Rondo in G major 
 Capriccio
 Due Divertimenti 
 Fantasy 
 Marcia funebre 
 Six Preludes 
 Rondino précédé d'une Introduction 
 Variations VII 
 Quick Waltz

Piano Duet
 Petit Rondeau in C major 
 Rondo brilliant in G major 
 Deux Pièces caractéristiques pour piano à quatre mains, Op.13 (published 1834): 
No. 1 in B minor, Andante con moto 
 No. 2 in C minor, Presto

Piano and orchestra
 Variations brillantes sur la Sehnsuchtswalzer of Franz Schubert in A-flat major, Op. 14
 Piano Concerto (lost)

Chamber music
 Duo Concertante for piano and horn 
 Petites variations for piano and violin in C major

Vocal works
 Mother's love
 With golden string full of sounds, 3 voices and piano 
 The slumbering love
 Four Songs 
 Spring song
  The young man at the brook
  The child's wish
  Gretchen's song
 Seven Songs 
 Lullaby
  Song of the Shepherdess 
  Craving
  The Bethe ends
  First Loss
  Erlkönig
  Farewell
 Five songs, Op. 8 
  Gretchen's song
  The expectation
  The arbor
  I want to tell you well
  The young man at the stream

References

External links
 
 

1810 births
1834 deaths
19th-century classical composers
19th-century classical pianists
19th-century deaths from tuberculosis
19th-century German composers
19th-century German male musicians
German classical pianists
German male classical composers
German pianists
German male pianists
German Romantic composers
Male classical pianists
Musicians from Kassel
People from the Kingdom of Westphalia
Pupils of Anton Reicha
Pupils of Robert Schumann
Tuberculosis deaths in Germany
German magazine founders